Italian Secret Service (also known as Il nostro agente Natalino Tartufato) is a 1968 Italian comedy film directed by Luigi Comencini. For his performance in this film and in Il padre di famiglia, Nino Manfredi was awarded with a Golden Plate at the 1968 Edition of David di Donatello.

Plot
Assassination attempts are constantly bungled.

Cast
 Nino Manfredi: Natalino Tartufato
 Françoise Prévost: Elvira Spallanzani
 Clive Revill: Charles Harrison
 Gastone Moschin: Lawyer Ramirez
 Jean Sobieski: Edward Stevens
 Giampiero Albertini: Ottone
 Alvaro Piccardi: Ciro
 Giorgia Moll: "The Bird"
 Enzo Andronico: Femore
 Attilio Dottesio: Russian agent

References

External links
 

1968 films
Commedia all'italiana
Films directed by Luigi Comencini
1968 comedy films
Films produced by Angelo Rizzoli
Films scored by Fiorenzo Carpi
1960s Italian-language films
1960s Italian films